Dorcadion ferdinandi is a species of beetle in the family Cerambycidae. It was described by Escalera in 1900. It is known from Spain.

See also 
Dorcadion

References

ferdinandi
Beetles described in 1900